Westwood is an NJ Transit railroad station in Westwood, New Jersey. It is on the Pascack Valley Line and is located at Broadway and Westwood Avenue. The next station northbound, heading toward Spring Valley, New York, is Hillsdale. The next station southbound, headed for Hoboken Terminal, is Emerson. The station consists of one track, one low-level platform with a miniature high-level platform and a station depot maintained by the borough of Westwood. Westwood also maintains the parking lots, consisting of 226 parking spaces, six of which are accessible based on the Americans With Disabilities Act of 1990.

History 
The station lasted until 1932, when after 25 years of fighting between the Erie Railroad and of the borough of Westwood, a new station was built, opening on November 13. In 2020 it was listed on the National Register of Historic Places.

Station layout
The station has one track and one low-level side platform. The platform is at Veteran's Memorial Park across from Broadway with its northern end at Washington Avenue and southern end at Jefferson Avenue. Permit parking is operated by the Borough of Westwood. Three permit parking lots area available, with 35, 67, 104 spots, respectively.

See also
National Register of Historic Places listings in Bergen County, New Jersey

References

External links

Station from Jefferson Avenue from Google Maps Street View
 Station House from Google Maps Street View
 Station from Washington Avenue from Google Maps Street View

NJ Transit Rail Operations stations
Railway stations in Bergen County, New Jersey
Railway stations on the National Register of Historic Places in New Jersey
National Register of Historic Places in Bergen County, New Jersey
Former Erie Railroad stations
Railway stations in the United States opened in 1870